César Rodolfo Blackman Camarena (born 2 April 1998) is a Panamanian professional footballer who plays as a right-back for Fortuna Liga club Dunajská Streda and the Panama national team.

Club career
Blackman made his Fortuna Liga debut for Dunajská Streda against Ružomberok on 10 March 2018.

International
He made his debut for the Panama national football team on 23 March 2019 in a friendly against Brazil, as an 85th-minute substitute for Michael Amir Murillo.

References

External links
FC DAC 1904 Dunajská Streda official club profile
Futbalnet profile

1998 births
Living people
Sportspeople from Panama City
Association football defenders
Panamanian footballers
Panamanian expatriate footballers
Panama youth international footballers
Panama international footballers
Unión Deportivo Universitario players
FC DAC 1904 Dunajská Streda players
Slovak Super Liga players
Expatriate footballers in Slovakia
Panamanian expatriate sportspeople in Slovakia